Franck Badiou (born 24 March 1967) is a French former sports shooter, Olympic medallist and coach. He won silver medal in the 10 metre air rifle at the 1992 Summer Olympics in Barcelona. He was also European Champion in the same discipline in 1993.

Badiou was born in Vitry-sur-Seine, Val-de-Marne. He took up shooting relatively late, at the age of 14, after talking about the sport with a school friend who was a pistol shooter.

After retiring from competition, Badiou was a coach for the French Shooting Federation for eight years. In 2005 he started working for the French biathlon team, preparing the squad's rifles. In 2016, he was appointed as the men's team's shooting coach. Badiou stepped down from the role in 2018, being succeeded by Patrick Favre.

References

1967 births
Living people
French male sport shooters
Shooters at the 1992 Summer Olympics
Olympic shooters of France
Olympic silver medalists for France
Olympic medalists in shooting
French sports coaches

Medalists at the 1992 Summer Olympics
20th-century French people